Thedwastre (also Thedwestry) was a hundred of the county of Suffolk, England covering an area of . It formed part of the Liberty of Saint Edmund, under the jurisdiction of the abbots of Bury St Edmunds.

The hundred is about twelve miles (19 km) in length and six miles (10 km) wide. It is bounded on the west by the borough of Bury St Edmunds and Thingoe Hundred, on the north and east by Blackbourn and Stow Hundreds, and on the south by Cosford and Babergh Hundreds. It is a fertile district with undulating terrain and watered by streams which rise within its limits and feeding the rivers Thet, Gipping, Lark and Brett.

It is in the Deanery of Thedwestry, the Archdeaconry of Sudbury, the Diocese of Ely and Liberty of St Edmund. It contains no town of any size, but Bury and Ixworth are on its borders.

Listed as Theivardestreu in the Domesday Book, the name derives from "Theodward's tree", presumably a notable tree where the Hundred Court used to meet in Thurston.

Parishes 

Thedwastre was made up of 24 parishes:

References

See also 

 Thedwastre Rural District

Hundreds of Suffolk
Thedwastre Hundred